Czacki is a surname. Notable people with the surname include:

 Tadeusz Czacki (1765–1813), Polish historian and pedagogue 
 Włodzimierz Czacki (1834–1888), Polish clergyman and diplomat
 blessed Róża Czacka (1876-1961), Polish philanthropist and nun 

Polish-language surnames